Torre de Ésera is a locality located in the municipality of Graus, in Huesca province, Aragon, Spain. As of 2020, it has a population of 53.

Geography 
Torre de Ésera is located 90km east of Huesca.

References

Populated places in the Province of Huesca